Love of My Life is a 2013 Australian horror/thriller directed and produced by Michael Budd in his directorial debut. The film stars Budd, Peter O'Brien, Diarmid Heidenreich and Bel Delia.

Plot

The film follows Julius, a man who mysteriously wakes up strapped to a hospital bed and is given the choice by what seems to be a deranged surgeon to either survive 5 days of torture, or say "I quit" and have the love of his life killed. The film follows Julius's fight for survival and the early stages of his relationship through a series of flash backs. The flashbacks then start becoming more intense and filter into his real world.

Cast

 Peter O'Brien as Thomas
 Diarmid Heidenreich as Julius
 Michael Budd as Reggie
 Bel Delia as Nicole
 Isaro Kayitesi as Keria
 Rob Messer as Samson
 Jean Pierre Yerma as Bar man

Production 
The film was shot completely in Sydney, Bathurst and Orange, NSW, Australia.

Release
 
The film had its premiere screening at the 2013 Mt. Hood Independent Film Festival. The film went on to win Best Horror/Thriller at the festival. The film has also been set for a February 2014 Video on Demand release with Gravitas Ventures.

References

External links
 
 

2013 films
2013 horror films
Australian horror thriller films
Films shot in Australia
2013 directorial debut films
2010s English-language films